The Mystery of the Hooded Horsemen is a 1937 American Western film directed by Ray Taylor. It was singing cowboy Tex Ritter's eighth film for Grand National Pictures.

Plot
Tex and Stubby keep their promise to a dying friend by helping his partner hold on to his gold mine, and to avenge his death by taking on and wiping out a horde of masked riders.

Cast 
Tex Ritter as Tex Martin
White Flash as Tex's horse
Iris Meredith as Nancy Wilson
Horace Murphy as Stubby
Charles King as Blackie Devlin
Earl Dwire as Sheriff Walker
Forrest Taylor as Norton
Joseph W. Girard as Dan Farley
Lafe McKee as Tom Wilson
Hank Worden as Deputy
Ray Whitley as Band Leader
The Range Ramblers as Saloon musicians

Soundtrack 
Tex Ritter - "Ride, Ride, Ride" (Written by Fred Rose and Michael David)
Tex Ritter - "I'm a Texas Cowboy"
Tex Ritter - "Ride Around Little Dogies"
Tex Ritter - "Rosita"
Tex Ritter - "A'Ridin' Old Paint"

External links 

1937 films
Grand National Films films
American black-and-white films
1937 Western (genre) films
American Western (genre) films
Films directed by Ray Taylor
1930s English-language films
1930s American films